The Choice Music Prize, known for sponsorship reasons as the RTÉ Choice Music Prize is an annual music prize awarded to the best album from a band or solo musician who is born in the Republic of Ireland or Northern Ireland or holds an Irish passport. For bands, the majority of members must have been born in the island of Ireland or hold an Irish passport.

Since it first began in 2005, the main awards ceremony had been broadcast live on the Irish independent and national radio station, Today FM, every March with the exception of the 2014 ceremony which took place on 27 February 2014 and it is also held in Vicar Street, Dublin with the exception of the 2012 ceremony which was held in the Olympia Theatre (Dublin).

After being broadcast on Today FM for nearly eleven years, in November 2016, it was announced that the Choice Music Prize would broadcast on RTÉ 2FM starting in 2017.

Previous presenters of the main awards ceremony have been Michelle Doherty, Rigsy and Today FM radio presenters Alison Curtis and Paul McLoone. The program has been sponsored since 2011 by Meteor and it was also broadcast live on Today FM since it first began in 2005, airing as a four-part special, beginning at 7pm and usually concluding at 11pm.

Establishment
The Choice Music Prize was established by journalist Jim Carroll and manager Dave Reid in 2005.

Aim of the awards

According to organisers, the aim of the Choice Music Prize, is to get more airplay for Irish acts both domestically and overseas.

"It was a strange thing" remembers Cormac Brady of Super Extra Bonus Party. "It's not something we ever expected to happen to us. Winning awards certainly wasn't what we got into music for, but it brought us a hell of a lot more recognition overnight and opened a lot of doors". Julie Feeney concurs. "It was probably the biggest achievement of my life" she says. "It meant a phenomenal amount to me. It was an enormous validation" as an alternative to the industry-dominated Meteor Music Awards. The Choice Music Prize is modelled after the Mercury Prize which is awarded each year to the best album from the United Kingdom or Ireland. It is a music award voted for by a panel of twelve judges based on artistic merit, regardless of genre, sales, or record label. The price includes a €10,000 cheque jointly funded by the Irish Music Rights Organisation (IMRO) and the Irish Recorded Music Association (IRMA). There is no sponsorship.

Initially considered by co-founder Carroll as a "titchy little maverick event", the Choice Music Prize has gained a reputation for producing "unpredictable" winners. Winners thus far consist of one solo female performer, four bands and one solo male performer. Julie Feeney won the inaugural prize for Irish Album of the Year 2005. She was followed by The Divine Comedy, Super Extra Bonus Party and Jape, winners of Irish Album of the Year 2006, 2007 and 2008 respectively. Adrian Crowley won Irish Album of the Year 2009, while Two Door Cinema Club won Irish Album of the Year 2010.

The ceremony to announce the winner takes place at Vicar Street, Dublin in February or March each year. Originally presented by Michelle Doherty and Rigsy, and also by Alison Curtis., Today FM radio presenter Paul McLoone presented the awards since 2012, having made his debut presiding over the 2011 Choice Music Prize ceremony and was the current host or M.C.- master of ceremonies for the prize giving ceremony with the show being broadcast live since its inception on the national and independent radio station Today FM as part of a four-hour special, airing between 7pm to 10pm. In November 2016, the Choice Music Prize announced that they had partnered with RTÉ and as such, the live ceremony will be broadcast on RTÉ 2FM from 2017 onwards. The nominated acts are invited to perform in front of a live audience at the ceremony. However, some nominated acts, such as The Chalets, Fionn Regan, Snow Patrol, Lisa Hannigan, Oppenheimer, Bell X1 and Laura Izibor, have not performed in the past due to other commitments. David Holmes (musician) and The Script also did not perform when nominated, though Holmes and Danny O'Donoghue attended the ceremony. The judging panel which is composed of various members of Irish media as such as music and broadcasting are all locked in an enclosed room during the performances on the night to debate over which act ought to win with Irish journalist Tony Clayton Lea who works for the Irish Times the Chairman of the Judging Panel with Clayton Lea also tasked with helping the panel come to a decision where they all select the one musician or band who will be announced as the winner of the Prize. A secret ballot was used to decide the winner of Irish Album of the Year 2008, Ritual.

Past winners and nominees have credited the Choice Music Prize with boosting their careers. Julie Feeney described winning Irish Album of the Year 2005 as "probably the biggest achievement of my life", adding "it meant a phenomenal amount to me. It was an enormous validation". Duke Special, nominated for the first two awards, said his nomination for the inaugural award had helped raise his profile in the Irish media. Cormac Brady stated Super Extra Bonus Party's Irish Album of the Year 2007 win "brought us a hell of a lot more recognition overnight and opened a lot of doors". Nominees have doubled or trebled sales after the award has been announced. Steve Jordan was influenced by the Choice Music Prize when he set up Canada's Polaris Music Prize. Culture Ireland invited figures from the international music industry to the event that decided the Irish Album of the Year 2010.

Broadcast
From its inception, the awards show was broadcast live on Today FM and a live streamed on entertainment.ie. In 2017, the awards show moved to a live broadcast on RTÉ 2FM, and highlights will continue to be shown on RTÉ2.

The event was aired live each year on Today FM in a special awards ceremony that takes place at Vicar Street which was presented by Paul McLoone and a pre-recorded show is aired on RTÉ2 television since 2015 on hosted by Bláthnaid Treacy. The event used to be streamed live on entertainment.ie and Muzu.tv until 2015.

Sponsorship
It was announced on Monday 10 October 2011 that Meteor had become the official sponsor of the award, having previously sponsored the Ireland Music Awards. In the run-up to the nominees (to be announced on 11 January 2012), both the award organisers and Meteor promised to present a number of live performances showcasing what they considered some of the best albums from 2011. Meteor Choice Music Prize Presents... began on 1 November 2011 with a live performance by Snow Patrol at Dublin's Button Factory, and was followed by a live performance from Lisa Hannigan and James Vincent McMorrow on 8 December 2011, also in Dublin's Button Factory.

In 2016, Samsung came on board to be the official partner of the awards show. However, from 2017 the awards show will be supported by RTÉ online, on radio and on television.

Winners and shortlisted nominees

Eligibility 
In order to be considered for the Choice Music Prize a release must meet all of the following conditions:

 All albums must have been released for the very first time in Ireland in the previous calendar year. This means that the album must have been made available for purchase by the general public (in shops, at gigs or on websites) for the very first time in Ireland (i.e. Republic of Ireland and/or Northern Ireland) between 1 January and 31 December of that year.
 Re-issues, multi-artist compilations, live albums and Best of collections are not eligible
 The artist(s) in question must have been born in Ireland (i.e. Republic of Ireland or Northern Ireland) and/or hold an Irish passport. Bands are eligible to be nominated if the majority of the band members were born in Ireland (i.e. Republic of Ireland or Northern Ireland) and/or hold an Irish passport.
 For the purposes of the Choice Music Prize, an album must contain six or more tracks and/or be over 33 minutes and 20 seconds in length.

There is no formal application process for the Choice Music Prize. Once an album meets the above criteria, it is eligible to be considered by the judges for selection.

See also
 Mercury Prize (United Kingdom)
 Polaris Music Prize (Canada)
 Australian Music Prize (Australia)
 Prix Constantin (France)
 Shortlist Music Prize (United States)
 Nordic Music Prize (Nordic countries)

References
General

Specific

External links
 Choice Music Prize official site

 
2000s in Irish music
2010s in Irish music
Awards established in 2005